Mr. Deng Goes to Washington is a 2015 Chinese historical documentary film written and directed by Fu Hongxing, starring Deng Xiaoping, Jimmy Carter, Henry Kissinger, Zbigniew Brzezinski, Rina Sa, and Chan Tin-suen. The film picks up the story of Chinese leader Deng Xiaoping's nine-day official visit to the US in 1979. The film was released on 15 May 2015 to commemorate the 35th anniversary of China and the United States establishing diplomatic relations.

Cast
 Deng Xiaoping as himself.
 Jimmy Carter as himself.
 Henry Kissinger as himself.
 Zbigniew Brzezinski as himself.
 Rina Sa
 Chan Tin-suen

Release
The film premiered in Shanghai on 13 May 2015 with wide-release in China on 15 May 2015.

References

External links
 
 

2015 films
2010s Mandarin-language films
2010s English-language films
Films shot in the United States
Films set in the United States
Films set in China
Chinese documentary films
Chinese historical films
Deng Xiaoping
Henry Kissinger
Jimmy Carter
Films set in the 1970s
2015 multilingual films
Chinese multilingual films